The classification of a reservoir by volume is not as straightforward as it may seem. As the name implies, water is held in reserve by a reservoir so it can serve a purpose.  For example, in Thailand, reservoirs tend to store water from the wet season to prevent flooding, then release it during the dry season for farmers to grow rice. For this type of reservoir, almost the entire volume of the reservoir functions for the purpose it was built.  Hydroelectric power generation, on the other hand, requires many dams to build up a large volume before operation can begin.  For this type of reservoir only a small portion of the water held behind the dam is useful. Therefore, knowing the purpose for which a reservoir has been constructed, and knowing how much water can be used for that purpose, helps determine how much water is in possible reserve.

Terminology
The following terms are used in connection with the volume of reservoirs:

Nominal Volume or Capacity is the total volume of all water held behind a dam at the maximum level possible.

Initial or Design Volume refers to the possible volume within the reservoir after it first opens.  Many rivers are high in silt that over time deposits behind a dam reducing capacity.

Active or Live volume equals the total capacity minus the dead pool volume.  This is the volume that can serve some downstream purpose. For example, it is the volume available to make hydroelectric power or provide drinking water to a city.

Dead pool or Minimum volume refers to the amount of water left in a reservoir that cannot be used for the general purpose the reservoir was constructed.  At this state, the reservoir is termed fully drawn down. For example, if built to supply water in the dry season, it is the water left behind when no more water can be extracted. Frequently, the effective minimum volume is greater if the water is needed for a purpose behind a dam.

Available capacity may require knowing the reservoir's primary purpose.  If it is designed to prevent flooding, it may be the volume of water that can be retained before reaching maximum or top water.

Actual or Current when coupled with another term reflects the fact the level behind the dam is not constant.

Expanded versus artificial lakes
The list below largely ignores many natural lakes that have been augmented with the addition of a relatively minor dam.  For example, a small dam, two hydroelectric plants, and locks on the outlet of Lake Superior make it possible to artificially control the lake level.  Certainly, the great majority of the lake is natural.  However, the control of water that can be held in reserve means a portion of the vast lake functions as a reservoir.

Recognition of lakes like Lake Superior greatly changes the list below. For example, the Francis H. Clergue Generating Station and Saint Marys Falls Hydropower Plant, which are both on the lake's outlet, operate with just 5.9 meters total head. This is short compared to other dams. However, when viewed against the 81,200 km2 area of the lake, even a small range in Lake Superior's water level means its active volume is greater than the largest nominal in the table below.

List

See also 
List of reservoirs by surface area
List of conventional hydroelectric power stations
List of largest reservoirs in the United States

References

Lists of buildings and structures
Lists of bodies of water